Rok Pajič (born September 26, 1985) is a Slovenian professional ice hockey player currently playing for HC Eppan Pirates of the Italian Hockey League

He participated at the 2011 IIHF World Championship as a member of the Slovenia men's national ice hockey team.

His father Murajica Pajič and uncle Boris Pajič are both former ice hockey players.

References

External links

1985 births
Living people
HC Berounští Medvědi players
HC Bílí Tygři Liberec players
Bolzano HC players
Motor České Budějovice players
Fife Flyers players
BK Mladá Boleslav players
SG Pontebba players
HC Pustertal Wölfe players
HC Slovan Ústečtí Lvi players
Slovenian ice hockey forwards
Sportspeople from Jesenice, Jesenice
HC Vrchlabí players
Slovenian expatriate ice hockey people
Slovenian expatriate sportspeople in Scotland
Slovenian expatriate sportspeople in Italy
Slovenian expatriate sportspeople in the Czech Republic
Expatriate ice hockey players in Italy
Expatriate ice hockey players in Scotland
Expatriate ice hockey players in the Czech Republic